Ozark Mountain Daredevils is the seventh album (and second self-titled one) issued by American country rock band The Ozark Mountain Daredevils.  It is their first and only album for the Columbia Records label after having issued six previous albums on A&M Records.

Critical reception
On the eve release Billboard magazine staff highlighted "dazzling guitar work" of John Dillon and Larry Lee. The musical content of the disc is filled with pop-rock numbers, and the influence of country is minimized.

Track listing
"Take You Tonight"
"Jump At The Chance"
"Sailin' Around The World"
"Lovin' You"
"Tuff Luck"
"Oh, Darlin'"
"Empty Cup"
"Rosalie"
"Runnin' Out"
"Fool's Gold"

Charts

Personnel
Steve Cash - harps, vocals
John Dillon - guitar, vocals
Michael "Supe" Granda - bass, vocals
Larry Lee - keyboard, guitar, percussion, vocals
with:
John Boylan - acoustic guitar 
Jon Goin - acoustic and electric guitars 
Paulette Brown - backing vocals
Rosemary Butler - backing vocals
Tom Kelly - backing vocals
Venetta Fields - backing vocals
Mike Botts - drums
Don Clinton Thompson - guitar
Rune Walle - guitar
Jai Winding - keyboards
Buddy Emmons - pedal steel guitar
Gary Coleman - percussion
Paul Grupp - percussion

References

The Ozark Mountain Daredevils albums
1980 albums
Albums produced by John Boylan (record producer)
Columbia Records albums